The 1913 Australasian Championships was a tennis tournament that took place on outdoor Grass courts at the Kitchener Park, Perth, Australia from 11 November to 15 November. It was the 9th edition of the Australian Championships (now known as the Australian Open), the 2nd held in Perth, and the third Grand Slam tournament of the year. The singles titles was won by Australian Ernie Parker.

Finals

Singles

 Ernie Parker defeated  Harry Parker  2–6, 6–1, 6–3, 6–2

Doubles
 Alf Hedeman /  Ernie Parker defeated  Harry Parker /  Roy Taylor 8–6, 4–6, 6–4, 6–4

External links
 Australian Open official Website

 
1913 in Australian tennis
1913
November 1913 sports events
1913 in New Zealand sport